Kabuati Bob is a Marshallese weightlifter. He represented Marshall Islands at the 2019 World Weightlifting Championships, as well as the 2015 World Championships.

References

External links

Living people
1994 births
Marshallese male weightlifters